Osztopán is a village in Somogy county, Hungary.

Etymology
The name comes from the Slavic Stupan derived from the Proto-Slavic stem stǫp- with several meanings and possible etymologies (i.e. stǫpa/stupa: trapping pit, see also the etymology of Stupava).

History
According to László Szita the settlement was completely Hungarian in the 18th century.

Highway bridge bombed by 97th BG on 30 June 1944 when primary target Blechammer oil refinery was overcast.

Culture
The Hungarian folk song Osztopáni malomárok was collected in Osztopán in 1949 by Ferenc Gönczi.

References

External links 
 Street map (Hungarian)

Populated places in Somogy County